Viscount Hereford is the oldest and only extant viscountcy in the Peerage of England, making the holder the Premier Viscount of England. The title was created in 1550 for Walter Devereux, 10th Baron Ferrers of Chartley.

History
The Devereux family is of French Norman descent and came to England after the Norman conquest in 1066 – this branch lorded over Lyonshall and Bodenham, Herefordshire, as their main estates. Sir Walter Devereux (died 1485) married Anne Ferrers, 8th Baroness Ferrers of Chartley (d. 1469) (see the Baron Ferrers of Chartley for earlier history of this title). He was summoned to Parliament as Lord Ferrers of Chartley in her right. Devereux was killed at the Battle of Bosworth in 1485, fighting on the side of King Henry VII. Their son, the eighth Baron, married Cicely, daughter of William Bourchier, Viscount Bourchier, son of Henry Bourchier, 1st Earl of Essex and 5th Baron Bourchier) (see the Baron Bourchier for more information on the Bourchier family). He was succeeded by his son, the ninth Baron, who served with distinction in the French Wars of King Henry VIII and was honoured in 1550 when he was created Viscount Hereford in the Peerage of England.

He was succeeded by a grandson, the son of his second son, Hon. Sir Richard Devereux. This latter Walter Devereux was also a prominent soldier during the reign of Queen Elizabeth I. Lord Hereford was a Field Marshal of the forces sent to quell the Northern Rebellion of 1569 and led an expedition to occupy Ulster in 1573. In 1570, he succeeded his first cousin twice removed as eighth Baron Bourchier in right of his great-grandmother Cecily Bourchier. In 1572, the earldom of Essex held by the Bourchier family (which had become extinct in 1540) was revived when he was created Earl of Essex in the Peerage of England. On his death the titles passed to his son Robert, the second Earl. He was the highly trusted courtier, soldier and favourite of Queen Elizabeth I. However, Lord Essex after many years defied the Queen and tried to raise a rebellion in London. He was condemned to death for high treason and beheaded in the Tower of London on 25 February 1601. His titles were forfeited.
However, his son Robert was restored in blood in 1603 and became the third Earl. He later fought as a Parliamentarian in the Civil War, leading the Parliamentary forces against Charles I at the Battle of Edgehill, the first major battle of the Civil War.  He died on 14 September 1646 and was buried in Westminster Abbey on the 19 October, both Houses of Parliament attending the funeral. On Lord Essex's death the earldom of Essex became extinct.  The barony of Ferrers of Chartley and barony of Bourchier fell into abeyance. leaving the viscountcy alone continuing (extant).

The Hereford viscountcy was inherited by the 4th Viscount's cousin, Sir Walter Devereux, 2nd Baronet, who became the 5th Viscount Hereford.  He had previously represented in different parliaments Worcester, Tamworth and Lichfield in the House of Commons.

The titles descended from father to son until the death of his grandson, the seventh Viscount, in 1683. This Viscount died at the age of nine and was succeeded by his younger brother, the eighth Viscount. He died childless at an early age and was succeeded by his second cousin once removed, the ninth Viscount. He was the great-grandson of Sir George Devereux, brother of the fifth Viscount, and had served as Member of Parliament for Montgomery prior to his succession in 1700. He was Lord-Lieutenant of Montgomeryshire 1711–14.

His son, the 10th Viscount, represented Montgomery in Parliament for over 20 years until his succession in 1740. He died without male issue and was succeeded by his kinsman, the 11th Viscount. He was a great-great grandson of Sir George Devereux mentioned.

Lord Hereford was succeeded by his eldest son, the 12th Viscount. He was childless and on his death in 1783 the titles passed to his younger brother, the 13th Viscount, who moved the principal Welsh seat of the viscountcy from Montgomeryshire to Pencoyd in Brecknockshire. He was succeeded by his son, the 14th Viscount. He was a Tory politician and served under the Duke of Wellington as Captain of the Honourable Band of Gentlemen Pensioners from 1828 to 1830 and under Sir Robert Peel as Captain of the Honourable Corps of Gentlemen-at-Arms from 1834 to 1835.

The 15th Viscount, the Reverend Robert, was an Hon. Canon of Durham. Then Robert Devereux, 16th Viscount Hereford succeeded in 1855; educated at Eton College and at Royal Military College, Sandhurst; he was a Justice of the peace, & Deputy lieutenant for Brecon, & JP for Hereford & Radnor. From 1924, the 17th Viscount resided at Hampton Court, Herefordshire, which was sold by his grandson, the 18th Viscount, in 1972. The 18th Viscount instead chose to make his home at Haseley Court, Oxfordshire, which he relinquished in 1982, when he settled at Lyford Cay, near Nassau, in the Bahamas.

The titles are held by the 19th Viscount, who succeeded his father in 2004.

The Devereux baronetcy, of Castle Bromwich in the County of Warwick, was created in the Baronetage of England in 1611 for the Hon. Edward Devereux, seated at Castle Bromwich Hall, landowner and the fourth son of the first Viscount Hereford. He had briefly served Tamworth in the House of Commons.  His eldest son succeeded his first cousin twice removed downwards as fifth Viscount Hereford in 1646.

The viscountcy of Hereford is the senior viscountcy in the Peerage of England. The Viscount Hereford is also the only one of the English Viscounts who does not hold a higher title.

Viscounts Hereford (1550)

Walter Devereux, 1st Viscount Hereford (1489–1558)
Hon. Sir Richard Devereux (died 1547)
Walter Devereux, 2nd Viscount Hereford (1539–1576) (created Earl of Essex in 1572)
Sir William Devereux of Mirevale Abbey
Henry Devereux
Hon. Edward Devereux created 1st Baronet see below

Earls of Essex (1572)
Walter Devereux, 1st Earl of Essex, 2nd Viscount Hereford (1539–1576) (see above)
Robert Devereux, 2nd Earl of Essex, 3rd Viscount Hereford (1566–1601)
Robert Devereux, 3rd Earl of Essex, 4th Viscount Hereford (1591–1646)
Robert Devereux, Viscount Hereford (1632 – c. 1638)

Viscounts Hereford (1550; reverted)
Walter Devereux, 5th Viscount Hereford (1578–1658)
Leicester Devereux, 6th Viscount Hereford (1617–1676)
Leicester Devereux, 7th Viscount Hereford (1674–1683)
Edward Devereux, 8th Viscount Hereford (1675–1700)
Price Devereux, 9th Viscount Hereford (1664–1740)
Price Devereux, 10th Viscount Hereford (1694–1748)
Edward Devereux, 11th Viscount Hereford (c. 1710 – 1760)
Edward Devereux, 12th Viscount Hereford (1740–1783)
George Devereux, 13th Viscount Hereford (1744–1804)
Henry Devereux, 14th Viscount Hereford (1777–1843)
Hon. Henry Cornewall Devereux (1807–1839)
Robert Devereux, 15th Viscount Hereford (1809–1855)
Robert Devereux, 16th Viscount Hereford (1843–1930)
Robert Charles Devereux, 17th Viscount Hereford (1865–1952)
Hon. Robert Godfrey de Bohun Devereux (1894–1934)
Robert Milo Leicester Devereux, 18th Viscount Hereford (1932–2004)
(Charles) Robin de Bohun Devereux, 19th Viscount Hereford (born 1975)

The heir apparent is the present holder's son, the Hon. Henry Walter de Bohun Devereux (born 2015).

Devereux baronets, of Castle Bromwich (1611)
Sir Edward Devereux, 1st Baronet of Castle Bromwich (c. 1550 – 1622)
Sir Walter Devereux, 2nd Baronet (1578–1658) (succeeded as Viscount Hereford in 1646)

Male-line family tree

Arms

See also
Earl of Essex
Baron Ferrers of Chartley
Baron Bourchier

References

Work cited

External links

 

Viscountcies in the Peerage of England
1550 establishments in England
Noble titles created in 1550
 
Viscount